Dirk DeWayne Minniefield (born January 17, 1961) is an American retired professional basketball player. While at Lafayette High School in Lexington, he was named the 1979 Kentucky "Mr. Basketball", an honor given to the top high school player in the state of Kentucky. In addition to "Mr. Basketball", he was also named a McDonald's and Parade High School All-American. Minniefield played his college ball at the University of Kentucky (UK), where he became a member of the 1,000 point club. In 1983, he was drafted in the second round (33rd overall) by the NBA's Dallas Mavericks. The , 180 lb (82 kg) guard played three seasons in NBA, making stops in Cleveland, Houston, Golden State, and Boston.

Early life

Minniefield began regularly using marijuana at age 14. Minniefield, who has been sober since the early 1990s, told a group of top high school prospects in 2007 that "My younger kids have never seen me take a drink. They don't know the daddy the older kids know. They know a totally different guy." (Minniefield was a father of three children by the time he graduated from high school, and has two children from his current marriage).

Drug Issues

His drug problem continued into college. He admitted to having carried a vial of cocaine with him regularly during his senior year at UK, and frequently took hits of the drug before games. Most notably, he admitted in 2007 that he and several teammates had gone to a park in Knoxville, Tennessee the night before Kentucky's showdown with Louisville in the 1983 NCAA Mideast Regional final and smoked marijuana. He also said that he smoked more marijuana after returning to his hotel room.

As fate would have it, he had the ball late in the game, with UK clinging to a narrow lead. He went into the lane and threw up a tentative shot that UofL center Charles Jones blocked. The Cardinals went on to force overtime and then dominated the extra period, winning 80-68. He would later say about the incident,

Minniefield's drug use eventually contributed to the early end of his NBA career. He returned to Lexington, but wound up serving a year in jail after writing bad checks and violating probation on those charges. His first wife divorced him and he left Lexington "penniless". He found his way to the John Lucas Drug Abuse Center in Houston; Minniefield would say of Lucas,  "I finally found that person who talked my language. He could see past the outside facade I learned to put up." For his part, Lucas said, "I call him one of my children. He's delightful. He's helped me as much as I helped him."

After treatment, Minniefield worked as transportation manager—according to him, "A better word is van driver"—for the San Antonio Spurs while Lucas was coach. He would go on to be a head coach/general manager in the United States Basketball League (USBL) for the Miami Tropics (a team that Lucas owned) and serve as the Spurs' strength and conditioning coach. When Lucas left for the Philadelphia 76ers, Minniefield took a job as a drug counselor with the NBA to enable him to stay in Houston.

Notes

External links
Stats at basketballreference.com
Kentucky career stats

1961 births
Living people
Albany Patroons players
American men's basketball players
Basketball players from Lexington, Kentucky
Boston Celtics players
Cleveland Cavaliers players
Dallas Mavericks draft picks
Houston Rockets players
Golden State Warriors players
Kentucky Wildcats men's basketball players
Louisville Catbirds players
McDonald's High School All-Americans
National Basketball Association executives
Parade High School All-Americans (boys' basketball)
Point guards
Shooting guards
Basketball players from Houston